Santa Maria de Guacimo Airport  is an airport serving the village of Santa Maria de Guacimo in Limón Province, Costa Rica.

See also

 Transport in Costa Rica
 List of airports in Costa Rica

References

External links
 OurAirports - Santa Maria de Guacimo
 OpenStreetMap - Santa Maria de Guacimo
 HERE/Nokia - Santa Maria de Guacimo
 Santa Maria de Guacimo

Airports in Costa Rica
Limón Province